The Nightmare Before Christmas (also known as Tim Burton's The Nightmare Before Christmas) is a 1993 American stop-motion animated musical dark fantasy film directed by Henry Selick (in his feature directorial debut) and produced and conceived by Tim Burton. It tells the story of Jack Skellington, the King of "Halloween Town", who stumbles upon "Christmas Town" and schemes to take over the holiday. Danny Elfman wrote the songs and score and provided the singing voice of Jack. The principal voice cast also includes Chris Sarandon, Catherine O'Hara, William Hickey, Ken Page, Paul Reubens, Glenn Shadix, and Ed Ivory.

The Nightmare Before Christmas originated in a poem written by Burton in 1982 while he was working as an animator at Walt Disney Productions. With the success of Vincent in the same year, Burton began to consider developing The Nightmare Before Christmas as either a short film or a half-hour television special, to no avail. Over the years, Burton's thoughts regularly returned to the project, and, in 1990, he made a development deal with Walt Disney Studios. Production started in July 1991 in San Francisco; Disney initially released the film through Touchstone Pictures because the studio believed the film would be "too dark and scary for kids".

The film met with critical success upon release, earning praise for its animation (particularly the innovation of the stop-motion art form), characters, songs and score. While only a modest box office hit at first, it has since garnered a large cult following. It was nominated for the Academy Award for Best Visual Effects, a first for an animated film, but lost to Jurassic Park. The film has since been reissued by Walt Disney Pictures and was re-released annually in Disney Digital 3-D from 2006 until 2010.

Plot
Halloween Town is a fantasy world populated by various monsters and beings associated with the holiday. Jack Skellington, respected by the citizens as the "Pumpkin King", leads them in organizing the annual Halloween celebrations. However, this year, Jack has grown tired of the same annual routine and wants something new. Wandering in the woods the next morning, he encounters seven trees containing doors leading to other holiday-themed worlds (Halloween, Christmas, Easter, Thanksgiving, Independence Day, Valentine’s Day, and St. Patrick’s Day) and stumbles into the one leading to Christmas Town. Awed by the unfamiliar holiday, Jack returns home to show his friends and neighbors his findings, but unaware of the idea of Christmas, they compare everything to their ideas of Halloween. However, they do relate to one Christmas Town character: its ruler, Santa Claus, or "Sandy Claws" as Jack mistakenly calls him. Jack sequesters himself in his house to study Christmas further and find a way to rationally explain it. After studying and experimentation accomplish nothing, Jack ultimately decides that Christmas should be improved rather than understood and announces that Halloween Town will take over Christmas this year.

Jack assigns the residents many Christmas-themed jobs, including singing carols, making presents, and building a sleigh pulled by skeletal reindeer. Sally, a feminine creation of local mad scientist Doctor Finkelstein, experiences a vision detailing that their efforts will end disastrously. Jack, whom she secretly loves, dismisses this and assigns her the task of making him a Santa Claus suit. He also tasks mischievous trick-or-treating trio Lock, Shock and Barrel to abduct Santa and bring him to Halloween Town. Jack tells Santa he will be handling Christmas in his place this year and orders the trio to keep Santa safe, but against his wishes, they deliver Santa to Jack's long-time rival, Oogie Boogie, a bogeyman with a passion for gambling, who plots to play a game with Santa's life at stake. Sally attempts to rescue Santa to save both him and Jack from their potential fates, but she is captured as well.

Jack departs to deliver his presents in the real world, but they instead frighten the populace, who contact the authorities and are instructed by them to lock down their homes and residences for protection. When word spreads about Jack's presumed wrongdoings, he is ultimately shot down by military forces, causing him to crash in a cemetery. While all of Halloween Town sadly believe him to be dead, Jack actually survives. As he bemoans the disaster he has caused, he finds he enjoyed the experience nonetheless, reigniting his love of Halloween, but soon realizes he must act fast to fix his mess. Jack returns home and infiltrates Oogie's lair, rescuing Santa and Sally before confronting Oogie and defeating him by unraveling a thread holding his cloth form together, causing all the bugs inside him to spill out and reduce him to nothing. Jack apologizes for his actions to Santa, to which he, despite being furious at Jack for the trouble he caused and not heeding Sally's forewarnings, assures him that he can still save Christmas. As Santa replaces Jack's presents with genuine ones, all of Halloween Town celebrates Jack's survival and return. Santa then shows Jack that there are no hard feelings between them by bringing a snowfall to the town, which fulfills Jack's original dream in a way and causes the residents to finally realize the true meaning of Christmas. Afterwards, Jack and Sally declare their love for each other.

Voice cast
 

Chris Sarandon (speaking voice) and Danny Elfman (singing voice) as Jack Skellington, a skeleton known as the "Pumpkin King" of Halloween Town. Elfman was initially cast as Jack's singing voice and, after the songs were recorded, Sarandon was cast to match Elfman's voice style.
Elfman also voices:
Barrel, one of the trick-or-treaters working for Oogie Boogie.
The Clown with the Tear-Away Face, a self-described clown who rides a unicycle.
Catherine O'Hara as Sally, a rag doll/Frankenstein's monster-like creation of Finkelstein and Jack's love interest. She is a toxicologist who uses various types of poison to liberate herself from the captivity of her "father". She is also psychic and has premonitions when anything bad is about to happen. O'Hara had previously co-starred in Burton's Beetlejuice.
O'Hara also voices Shock, one of the trick-or-treaters working for Oogie Boogie.
William Hickey as Doctor Finkelstein, a mad scientist and the loving but overbearing "father" of Sally. He is listed in the credits only as "Evil Scientist" and is only mentioned by name twice in the film.
Glenn Shadix as the Mayor of Halloween Town, an enthusiastic leader who conducts town meetings. His wild mood swings from happy to distraught because his head spins between a "happy" and "sad" face; where some career politicians are described as figuratively two-faced, the mayor is literally so. Shadix and Burton had previously worked on Beetlejuice.
Ken Page as Oogie Boogie, a villainous bogeyman in Halloween Town, who has a passion for gambling and rivalry with Jack.
Ed Ivory as Santa Claus, the ruler of Christmas Town. Santa is responsible for the annual celebration of Christmas, in which he delivers presents to children in the real world. He is also referred to by Jack and Halloween Town's residents as "Sandy Claws". Ivory also provides the brief narration at the start of the film.
Paul Reubens as Lock, one of the trick-or-treaters working for Oogie Boogie. Reubens and Burton had previously worked on Pee-wee's Big Adventure and Batman Returns.
Frank Welker as Zero, Jack's pet ghost dog who has a tiny Jack-o'-lantern on top of his nose.

The cast also features Kerry Katz, Carmen Twillie, Randy Crenshaw, Lisa Donovan Lukas, Debi Durst, Glenn Walters, Sherwood Ball, John Morris and Greg Proops voicing various characters. Patrick Stewart recorded narration for a prologue and epilogue. While not used in the final film, the narration is included on the soundtrack album.

Production

Development
As writer Burton's upbringing in Burbank, California, was associated with the feeling of solitude, the filmmaker was largely fascinated by holidays during his childhood. "Anytime there was Christmas or Halloween, […] it was great. It gave you some sort of texture all of a sudden that wasn't there before," Burton would later recall. After completing his short film Vincent in 1982, Burton, who was then employed at Walt Disney Feature Animation, wrote a three-page poem titled The Nightmare Before Christmas, drawing inspiration from television specials of Rudolph the Red-Nosed Reindeer, How the Grinch Stole Christmas! and the poem A Visit from St. Nicholas. Burton intended to adapt the poem into a television special with the narration spoken by his favorite actor, Vincent Price, but also considered other options such as a children's book. He created concept art and storyboards for the project in collaboration with Rick Heinrichs, who also sculpted character models; Burton later showed his and Heinrichs' works-in-progress to Henry Selick, also a Disney animator at the time. After the success of Vincent in 1982, Disney started to consider developing The Nightmare Before Christmas as either a short film or 30-minute holiday television special. However, the project's development eventually stalled, as its tone seemed "too weird" to the company. As Disney was unable to "offer his nocturnal loners enough scope", Burton was fired from the studio in 1984 and went on to direct the commercially successful films Beetlejuice (1988) and Batman (1989) for Warner Bros. Pictures.

Over the years, Burton regularly thought about the project. In 1990, Burton found out that Disney still owned the film rights. He and Selick committed to produce a full-length film with the latter as director. Burton's own success with live-action films piqued the interest of Walt Disney Studios chairman Jeffrey Katzenberg, who saw the film as an opportunity to continue the studio's streak of recent successes in feature animation. Disney was looking forward to Nightmare "to show capabilities of technical and storytelling achievements that were present in Who Framed Roger Rabbit." Walt Disney Pictures president David Hoberman believed the film would prove to be a creative achievement for Disney's image, elaborating "we can think outside the envelope. We can do different and unusual things."

Nightmare marked Burton's third consecutive film with a Christmas setting. Burton could not direct because of his commitment to Batman Returns, and he did not want to be involved with "the painstakingly slow process of stop motion". To adapt his poem into a screenplay, Burton approached Michael McDowell, his collaborator on Beetlejuice. McDowell and Burton experienced creative differences, which convinced Burton to make the film as a musical with lyrics and compositions by frequent collaborator Danny Elfman. Elfman and Burton created a rough storyline and two-thirds of the film's songs. Elfman found writing Nightmares eleven songs to be "one of the easiest jobs I've ever had. I had a lot in common with Jack Skellington." Caroline Thompson had yet to be hired to write the screenplay. With Thompson's screenplay, Selick stated, "there are very few lines of dialogue that are Caroline's. She became busy on other films and we were constantly rewriting, re-configuring and developing the film visually."

Filming
Selick and his team of animators began production in July 1991 in San Francisco, California, with a crew of over 120 workers, utilizing 20 sound stages for filming. Joe Ranft was hired from Disney as a storyboard supervisor, while Eric Leighton was hired to supervise animation. At the peak of production, 20 individual stages were simultaneously being used for filming. In total, there were 109,440 frames taken for the film. The work of Ray Harryhausen, Ladislas Starevich, Edward Gorey, Étienne Delessert, Gahan Wilson, Charles Addams, Jan Lenica, Francis Bacon, and Wassily Kandinsky influenced the filmmakers. Selick described the production design as akin to a pop-up book. In addition, Selick stated, "When we reach Halloween Town, it's entirely German Expressionism. When Jack enters Christmas Town, it's an outrageous Dr. Seuss-esque setpiece. Finally, when Jack is delivering presents in the 'Real World', everything is plain, simple and perfectly aligned." Vincent Price, Don Ameche, and James Earl Jones were considered to provide the narration for the film's prologue; however, all proved difficult to cast, and the producers instead hired local voice artist Ed Ivory. Patrick Stewart provided the prologue narration for the film's soundtrack.

On the direction of the film, Selick reflected, "It's as though he [Burton] laid the egg, and I sat on it and hatched it. He wasn't involved in a hands-on way, but his hand is in it. It was my job to make it look like 'a Tim Burton film', which is not so different from my own films." When asked about Burton's involvement, Selick claimed, "I don't want to take away from Tim, but he was not in San Francisco when we made it. He came up five times over two years, and spent no more than eight or ten days in total." Walt Disney Feature Animation contributed with some second-layering traditional animation. Burton found production somewhat difficult, because he was simultaneously filming Batman Returns and pre-production of Ed Wood.

The filmmakers constructed 227 puppets to represent the characters in the movie, with Jack Skellington having "around four hundred heads", allowing the expression of every possible emotion. Sally's mouth movements "were animated through the replacement method. During the animation process, […] only Sally's face 'mask' was removed in order to preserve the order of her long, red hair. Sally had ten types of faces, each made with a series of eleven expressions (e.g. eyes open and closed, and various facial poses) and synchronized mouth movements." The stop-motion figurine of Jack was reused in James and the Giant Peach (also directed by Selick) as Captain Jack.

Soundtracks

The film's soundtrack album was released in 1993 on Walt Disney Records. The film's soundtrack contains bonus tracks, including a longer prologue and an extra epilogue, both narrated by Sir Patrick Stewart. For the film's 2006 re-release in Disney Digital 3-D, a special edition of the soundtrack was released, featuring a bonus disc that contained covers of five of the film's songs by Fall Out Boy, Panic! at the Disco, Marilyn Manson, Fiona Apple, and She Wants Revenge. Four original demo tracks by Elfman were also included. On September 30, 2008, Disney released the cover album Nightmare Revisited, featuring artists such as Amy Lee, Flyleaf, Korn, Rise Against, Plain White T's, The All-American Rejects, and many more.

American gothic rock band London After Midnight featured a cover of "Sally's Song" on their 1998 album Oddities.

LiLi Roquelin performed a French cover of "Sally's Song" on her album Will you hate the rest of the world or will you renew your life? in 2010.

Pentatonix released a cover of "Making Christmas" for their 2018 Christmas album Christmas Is Here!.

In 2003, the Disneyland Haunted Mansion Holiday soundtrack CD was released. Although most of the album's songs are not original ones from the film, one song is a medley of "Making Christmas", "What's This?", and "Kidnap the Sandy Claws". Other songs included are original holiday songs changed to incorporate the theme of the film. However, the last song is the soundtrack for the Disneyland Haunted Mansion Holiday ride.

Release
The Nightmare Before Christmas was originally going to be released under Walt Disney Pictures as part of the Walt Disney Feature Animation lineup, but Disney decided to release the film under the studio's adult-orientated Touchstone Pictures banner, because the studio thought the film would be "too dark and scary for kids," Selick remembered. "Their biggest fear, and why it was kind of a stepchild project, [was] they were afraid of their core audience hating the film and not coming." To convey Burton's involvement and attract a wider audience, Disney marketed the film as Tim Burton's The Nightmare Before Christmas. Burton explained that, "…it turned more into more of a brand-name thing, it turned into something else, which I'm not quite sure about." The film premiered at the New York Film Festival on October 9, 1993, and was given a limited release on October 13, 1993, before its wide theatrical release on October 29, 1993.

The Nightmare Before Christmas was reissued under the Walt Disney Pictures label and re-released on October 20, 2006, with conversion to Disney Digital 3-D, and was accompanied by Pixar's short film Knick Knack. Industrial Light & Magic assisted in the process. The film subsequently received three re-releases on October 19, 2007, October 24, 2008, and October 23, 2009. The El Capitan Theatre in Hollywood, California, has been showing the film in 4-D screenings annually in October, ending on Halloween, since 2010. The reissues have led to a reemergence of 3-D films and advances in RealD Cinema.

In October 2020, The Nightmare Before Christmas was re-released in 2,194 theaters. It made $1.323 million over the weekend, finishing fourth behind Tenet.

Home media
With years of successful home video sales, The Nightmare Before Christmas later achieved the ranks of a cult film. Touchstone Home Video first released the film on VHS on September 30, 1994, and on DVD on December 2, 1997. The Nightmare Before Christmas was released on DVD a second time on October 3, 2000, as a special edition. The release included an audio commentary by Selick and cinematographer Pete Kozachik, a 28-minute making-of documentary, a gallery of concept art, storyboards, test footage and deleted scenes. Burton's Vincent and Frankenweenie were also included. Both DVDs were non-anamorphic widescreen releases.

Walt Disney Studios Home Entertainment released the film on DVD again (this time with an anamorphic transfer) and on Blu-ray Disc (for the first time) on August 26, 2008, as a two-disc digitally remastered "collector's edition", but still containing the same special features.

Walt Disney Studios Home Entertainment released The Nightmare Before Christmas on Blu-ray 3D on August 30, 2011. The release included a Blu-ray 3D disc, Blu-ray disc and a DVD that includes both a DVD and digital copy of the film.

In 2018, Disney issued a singalong version of the film, accompanied by the theatrical cut and a Movies Anywhere copy, as a single-disc version for the film's 25th anniversary. The singalong version was also released on Disney+ on September 30, 2022.

Marketing
Disney has extensively marketed the film and its characters across many forms of media and memorabilia, including action figures, books, games, art crafts, and fashion products. Jack Skellington, Sally, Pajama Jack, and the Mayor have been made into bendable figures, while Jack and Sally even appear in fine art.  Sally has been made into an action figure and a Halloween costume.

Various Disneyland and the branching theme parks host attractions featuring Nightmare characters, particularly during Halloween and Christmas seasons. Since 2001, Disneyland has given its Haunted Mansion Holiday attraction a Nightmare Before Christmas theme for the holiday season. It features characters, decorations and music from the film, in addition to Mickey's Not-So-Scary Halloween Party and Mickey's Halloween Party featuring the film's characters. Additionally, Jack hosts the Halloween Screams, HalloWishes, and Not So Spooky Spectacular! fireworks shows at Magic Kingdom (where the host is Ghost Host) and Disneyland (where the host is Jack himself), as well as the Frightfully Fun Parade.

Reception

Box office
Around the release of the film, Hoberman was quoted, "I hope Nightmare goes out and makes a fortune. If it does, great. If it doesn't, that doesn't negate the validity of the process. The budget was less than any Disney blockbuster so it doesn't have to earn Aladdin-sized grosses to satisfy us." The film earned $50 million in the United States in its initial theatrical run and was regarded as a moderate "sleeper hit".

The Nightmare Before Christmas made an additional $11.1 million in box office gross in its 2006 reissue. The 2007, 2008, 2009, and 2020 reissues earned $15.8 million, $2.5 million, and $2.3 million respectively, increasing the film's total box office gross to $91.5 million.

Critical response
On Rotten Tomatoes, the film holds a rating of 95% based on 100 reviews, with an average rating of 8.27/10. The site's critics consensus reads, "The Nightmare Before Christmas is a stunningly original and visually delightful work of stop-motion animation." On Metacritic, the film has a weighted average score of 82 out of 100, based on 30 critics, indicating "universal acclaim". Audiences surveyed by CinemaScore gave the film an average grade "B+" on an A+ to F scale.

Roger Ebert gave a highly positive review for Nightmare. Ebert believed the film's visual effects were as revolutionary as Star Wars, taking into account that Nightmare was "filled with imagination that carries us into a new world".

Peter Travers of Rolling Stone called it a restoration of "originality and daring to the Halloween genre. This dazzling mix of fun and fright also explodes the notion that animation is kid stuff. … It's 74 minutes of timeless movie magic." James Berardinelli stated "The Nightmare Before Christmas has something to offer just about everyone. For the kids, it's a fantasy celebrating two holidays. For the adults, it's an opportunity to experience some light entertainment while marveling at how adept Hollywood has become at these techniques. There are songs, laughs, and a little romance. In short, The Nightmare Before Christmas does what it intends to: entertain." Desson Thomson of The Washington Post enjoyed the film's similarities to the writings of Oscar Wilde and the Brothers Grimm, as well as The Cabinet of Dr. Caligari and other German Expressionist films.

Michael A. Morrison discusses the influence of Dr. Seuss' How the Grinch Stole Christmas! on the film, writing that Jack parallels the Grinch and Zero parallels Max, the Grinch's dog. Philip Nel writes that the film "challenges the wisdom of adults through its trickster characters", contrasting Jack as a "good trickster" with Oogie Boogie, whom he also compares with Seuss' Dr. Terwilliker as a bad trickster. Entertainment Weekly reports that fan reception of these characters borders on obsession, profiling Laurie and Myk Rudnick, a couple whose "degree of obsession with [the] film is so great that … they named their son after the real-life person that a character in the film is based on." This enthusiasm for the characters has also been profiled as having spread beyond North America to Japan. Yvonne Tasker notes "the complex characterization seen in The Nightmare Before Christmas".

Danny Elfman was worried the characterization of Oogie Boogie would be considered racist by the National Association for the Advancement of Colored People (NAACP). Screenwriter Caroline Thompson raised similar concerns about the character, only to be told by Burton that she was "being oversensitve". Elfman's predictions came true; however, director Henry Selick stated the character was inspired by the Betty Boop cartoon The Old Man of the Mountain. "Cab Calloway would dance his inimitable jazz dance and sing 'Minnie the Moocher' or 'Old Man of the Mountain', and they would rotoscope him, trace him, turn him into a cartoon character, often transforming him into an animal, like a walrus," Selick continued. "I think those are some of the most inventive moments in cartoon history, in no way racist, even though he was sometimes a villain. We went with Ken Page, who is a black singer, and he had no problem with it".

Accolades
The film was nominated for both the Academy Award for Best Visual Effects and the Hugo Award for Best Dramatic Presentation. Nightmare won the Saturn Award for Best Fantasy Film, while Elfman won Best Music. Selick and the animators were also nominated for their work. Elfman was nominated for the Golden Globe Award for Best Original Score. Most recently, the film ranked #1 on Rotten Tomatoes' "Top 25 Best Christmas Movies" list.

Possible sequel

In 2001, Disney began to consider producing a sequel, but rather than using stop motion, Disney wanted to use computer animation. Burton convinced Disney to drop the idea. "I was always very protective of [The Nightmare Before Christmas], not to do sequels or things of that kind," Burton explained. "You know, Jack visits Thanksgiving world or other kinds of things just because I felt the movie had a purity to it and the people that like it, because it's a mass-market kind of thing, it was important to kind of keep that purity of it." The 2004 video game The Nightmare Before Christmas: Oogie's Revenge did serve as a sequel of the film, with Capcom's crew of developers going after Burton for advice and having the collaboration of the film's art director, Deane Taylor. In 2009, Selick said he would do a film sequel if he and Burton could create a good story for it.

In February 2019, it was reported that a new Nightmare Before Christmas film was in the works with Disney considering either a stop-motion sequel or live-action remake. In October 2019, Chris Sarandon expressed interest on reprising his role as Jack Skellington if a sequel film ever materializes.

On February 22, 2021, it was announced by Disney Publishing that a sequel was given to the 1993 film in the form of a young adult novel, released as Long Live the Pumpkin Queen. It was written by Shea Ernshaw and features Sally as the main character, told through her point-of-view, with events taking place after the film. The book was released on August 2, 2022.

Related media

Toys and games
A collectible card game based on the film called The Nightmare Before Christmas TCG was released in 2005 by NECA. The game was designed by Quixotic Games founder Andrew Parks and Zev Shlasinger. It consists of a Premiere set and 4 Starter Decks based on four characters, Jack Skellington, the Mayor, Oogie Boogie, and Doctor Finkelstein. Each Starter Deck contains a rule book, a Pumpkin King card, a Pumpkin Points card, and a 48-card deck. The game has four card types: Characters, Locales, Creations, and Surprises. The Cards' rarities are separated into four categories: Common, Uncommon, Rare, Ultra Rare.

Quixotic Games also developed The Nightmare Before Christmas Party Game that was released in 2007 by NECA.

A collector's edition The Nightmare Before Christmas-themed Jenga game was issued with orange, purple and black blocks with Jack Skellington heads on them. The set comes in a coffin-shaped box instead of the normal rectangular box.

A 168-card Munchkin Tim Burton's The Nightmare Before Christmas-themed Munchkin was developed by USAopoly featuring the citizens of Halloween Town such as Jack Skellington, Oogie Boogie, Doctor Finkelstein, and Lock, Shock and Barrel. The game comes with a custom die similar to the ones used by Oogie Boogie in the film.

On September 15, 2020, a The Nightmare Before Christmas-themed tarot card deck and guidebook was released and the illustration was done by Abigail Larson.

Books, comics, and manga
In 1993, a pop-up book based on the film was released on October 1. Another pop-up book calendar titled Nightmare Before Christmas Pop-Up Book and Advent Calendar was released September 29, 2020. Jack is the titular character in the short story "Tim Burton's The Nightmare Before Christmas: Jack's Story". Disney Press released a Tim Burton's The Nightmare Before Christmas Party Cookbook: Recipes and Crafts for the Perfect Spooky Party on August 21, 2017. A behind-the-scenes art book titled Tim Burton's Nightmare Before Christmas: The Film, the Art, the Vision was released on October 14, 1993, and a Disney Editions Deluxe edition was published July 28, 2009.

In 2006, a picture book containing the poem Tim Burton wrote that originated the film was released on August 15. In celebration of the film's 20th anniversary, the poem was re-released with a hardcover edition in 2013. On July 20, 2009, an illustrated book covering a rendition of "The Twelve Days of Christmas" song titled Nightmare Before Christmas: The 13 Days of Christmas was published. In celebration of the film's 25th anniversary, a book and CD, featuring narration and sound effects, was released on July 3, 2018.

In honor of the film's 25th anniversary, a Cinestory Comic made by Disney and published by Joe Books LTD was released on September 26, 2017. A graphic novel retelling of the film by Joe Books LTD was released on July 31, 2018, and digital and hardcover versions were released August 25, 2020. On November 26, 2020, a novel retelling of the film version was released as part of the Disney Animated Classics series. In 2021, another version of Nightmare Before Christmas 13 Days of Christmas came out on July 6 and was soon followed by Little Golden Books's release of their adaptation of Nightmare Before Christmas on July 13, 2021.

In 2017, Tokyopop secured exclusive licensing for two manga adaptions for Nightmare Before Christmas, with the first manga being an adaptation of the film's plot line, with art by Jun Asuka, released October 17. The second manga, a fully-colored series illustrated by Kei Ishiyama and titled Zero's Journey, chronicles the adventures of Jack's dog, Zero, in his experiences beginning in Christmas Town after accidentally getting separated from Jack, who tries to find him, and acts as a sequel to the film, with Tim Burton's story approval. The 20 issues were first published monthly, starting on October 2, and then collected into four full-color graphic novels, with a black-and-white collector's edition manga edition as well. Starting on July 21, 2021, Tokyopop released another sequel manga centered around Sally, titled The Nightmare Before Christmas: Mirror Moon, written by Mallory Reaves and fully-colored series illustrated by Gabriella Chianello, and Nataliya Torretta. The first two issues will be collected into a graphic novel that is slated to be released on October 26.

A novelization of the film written by Daphne Skinner was published on January 1, 1994. In 2021, a young adult novel written by Shea Ernshaw with Sally as the protagonist, with the premised described as "...takes place shortly after the movie ends. It's the yet-to-be-told love story of Sally and Jack. But it's also a coming-of-age story for Sally, as we see her navigate her new royal title as the Pumpkin Queen of Halloween Town". The novel introduced new characters and explored Sally's past, as well as exploring other holiday worlds as Sally and Jack tackle a mysterious villain Sally has accidentally unleashed. The novel was slated to be released in July 2022. On her Instagram, Shea Ernshaw revealed the novel's title, Long Live the Pumpkin Queen; it was released on August 2, 2022.
 
On November 1, 2022, Tokyopop announced a  full-colored graphic novel series titled Disney Tim Burton’s The Nightmare Before Christmas: The Battle for Pumpkin King, which centers around the friendship and rivalry between a young Jack Skellington and Oogie Boogie. The graphic novel will consist of five issues and will be available for Halloween 2023.

Video games
The Nightmare Before Christmas has inspired video game spin-offs, including Oogie's Revenge and The Pumpkin King.

The Kingdom Hearts series includes Halloween Town as a world, appearing in the titles Kingdom Hearts, Chain of Memories, Kingdom Hearts II, and 358/2 Days, with Christmas Town also as a major area in Kingdom Hearts II. Jack Skellington appears as a party member of the protagonist, Sora, while other important characters from the film appear as supporting characters in the world. The games adapt parts of the plot of The Nightmare Before Christmas.

A Jack Skellington figurine is available for the Disney Infinity video game, allowing the character to be playable in the game's "Toy Box Mode". The main characters of the film (except Santa Claus) appear as playable characters in the video game Disney Magic Kingdoms, as well as in some attractions based on locations of the film, in new storylines in which the characters are involved. Jack and Oogie Boogie are feature as playable units in many Disney-related mobile games, such as Disney Heroes: Battle Mode, Disney Sorcerer's Arena, and Disney Mirrorverse.

In 2021, a collaboration between Disney and Fall Guys released a seasonal challenge themed after The Nightmare Before Christmas, which was available from December 16 through December 27.

Concerts

A live concert, produced by Disney Concerts, was held at the Hollywood Bowl in October 2015 and was followed by subsequent performances in 2016 and 2018. The shows featured Elfman, O'Hara, and Page reprising their roles from the film. In December 2019, this show came to Europe, with dates in Edinburgh, Glasgow, London and Dublin.

A one-night-only virtual benefit concert presentation of the film, presented by The Actors Fund and produced by James Monroe Iglehart with the cooperation of Burton, Elfman, Disney and Actors' Equity Association, streamed on October 31, 2020. 100% of the proceeds will benefit the Lymphoma Research Foundation, as a response to the COVID-19 pandemic and its impact on the performing arts. The cast included Iglehart as Oogie Boogie, along with Rafael Casal as Jack Skellington, Adrienne Warren as Sally, Danny Burstein as Santa Claus and the Narrator, Nik Walker as Lock, Lesli Margherita as Shock and Rob McClure as Barrel. Rounding out the cast were Kathryn Allison, Jenni Barber, Erin Elizabeth Clemons, Fergie L. Phillipe, Jawan M. Jackson and Brian Gonzalez.

In October 2021, Disney hosted a live-to-film concert of Tim Burton's The Nightmare Before Christmas for two nights at LA's Banc of California Stadium on October 29 and 31. The show featured Billie Eilish singing as Sally and Danny Elfman reprising his role as Jack. Ken Page reprised the role of Oogie Boogie, while "Weird Al" Yankovic sang as Lock. The concert included a full orchestra led by acclaimed conductor John Mauceri to perform the film's score and songs live.

In October 2021, Disney announced that they were hosting another live-to-film concert at the OVO Arena Wembley in London on December 9 and 10, 2022. The show featured Elfman and Page reprising respective their roles, while John Mauceri returned as conductor alongside the BBC Concert Orchestra. Acclaimed singer and songwriter Phoebe Bridgers took on the role of Sally.

Other media
Disney Interactive Studios released an As Told by Emoji animated adaptation of The Nightmare Before Christmas in 2016, which can be found on their official YouTube channel. In 2019, a behind-the-scenes podcast series about The Nightmare Before Christmas was made, featuring the animators, producers and other crew discussing the making of the movie, totaling 38 episodes.

See also

List of ghost films
 List of Christmas films
 Santa Claus in film

Notes

References
 Notes

 Footnotes

Further reading
 
  Manga adaptation of the film.

External links

The Nightmare Before Christmas at the TCM Movie Database

The Nightmare Before Christmas at The Tim Burton Collective

Nightmare Before Christmas Behind The Scenes A time lapse of the stop-motion animation process.

 
1990s stop-motion animated films
1990s Christmas films
1993 films
1993 animated films
1990s American animated films
1990s Christmas horror films
1990s English-language films
1993 horror films
1990s monster movies
American 3D films
American children's animated fantasy films
American animated horror films
American children's animated musical films
American Christmas films
American monster movies
American musical fantasy films
American Christmas horror films
American dark fantasy films
American ghost films
American supernatural films
Children's horror films
Demons in film
American films about Halloween
Films based on poems
Films directed by Henry Selick
Films scored by Danny Elfman
Films about parallel universes
Santa Claus in film
Films with screenplays by Caroline Thompson
Films about witchcraft
1990s musical films
Stop-motion animated films
Touchstone Pictures animated films
Walt Disney Pictures animated films
Films produced by Tim Burton
Films produced by Denise Di Novi
3D re-releases
1993 directorial debut films